Calcium phosphide (CP) is the inorganic compound with the formula Ca3P2.  It is one of several phosphides of calcium, being described as the salt-like material composed of Ca2+ and P3−.  Other, more exotic calcium phosphides have the formula CaP, CaP3, Ca2P2, and Ca5P8.

Ca3P2 has the appearance of red-brown crystalline powder or grey lumps. Its trade name is Photophor for the incendiary use or Polytanol  for the use as rodenticide.

Preparation and structure
It may be formed by reaction of the elements, but it is more commonly prepared by carbothermal reduction of calcium phosphate:
Ca3(PO4)2  +  8 C  →   Ca3P2  +  8 CO

The structure of the room temperature form of Ca3P2 has not been confirmed by X-ray crystallography. A high temperature phase has been characterized by Rietveld refinement.  Ca2+ centers are octahedral.

Uses
Metal phosphides are used as a rodenticide. A mixture of food and calcium phosphide is left where the rodents can eat it. The acid in the digestive system of the rodent reacts with the phosphide to generate the toxic gas phosphine. This method of vermin control has possible use in places where rodents immune to many of the common warfarin-type (anticoagulant) poisons have appeared. Other pesticides similar to calcium phosphide are zinc phosphide and aluminium phosphide.

Calcium phosphide is also used in fireworks, torpedoes, self-igniting naval pyrotechnic flares, and various water-activated ammunition. During the 1920s and 1930s, Charles Kingsford Smith used separate buoyant canisters of calcium carbide and calcium phosphide as naval flares lasting up to ten minutes. It is speculated that calcium phosphide—made by boiling bones in urine, within a closed vessel—was an ingredient of some ancient Greek fire formulas.

Calcium phosphide is a common impurity in calcium carbide, which may cause the resulting phosphine-contaminated acetylene to ignite spontaneously.

See also  
 Phosphorus

References

Phosphides
Calcium compounds
Rodenticides
Fumigants